Simon Orchard (born July 1986) is an Australian field hockey player. He plays for New South Wales in the Australian Hockey League. He is a member of the Australia men's national field hockey team and has won several medals with them including gold at the 2009 Men's Hockey Champions Trophy, gold at the 2010 Men's Hockey World Cup and gold at the 2010 and 2014 Commonwealth Games.

Personal
Orchard was born in July 1986 in Muswellbrook, New South Wales. His hobbies include playing golf and playing his guitar. He took up hockey at the age of 11. He is married to Airlie Ogilvie, formerly of the Hockeyroos.

Field hockey
Orchard plays for New South Wales in the Australian Hockey League. He played in a June 2010 game for the New South Wales against the Tassie Tigers that New South Wales won 6–3.  He scored a goal in the game.

National team
Orchard is a member of the Kookaburras. In January 2008, he made his senior national team debut at the Five Nations men's hockey tournament in South Africa. He represented Australia at the 2009 Champions Trophy, where his team earned a gold medal. New national team coach Ric Charlesworth named him, a returning member, alongside fourteen total new players who had few than 10 national team caps to the squad before in April 2009 in a bid to ready the team for the 2010 Commonwealth Games. In 2010, he won a gold medal at the World Cup. He represented Australia at the 2010 Commonwealth Games. In the gold medal match against India that Australia won 8–0, he scored a goal. In May 2011, he played in the Azlan Shah Cup for Australia.  The Cup featured teams from Pakistan, Malaysia, India, South Korea, Britain and New Zealand. In December 2011, he was named as one of twenty-eight players to be on the 2012 Summer Olympics Australian men's national training squad.  This squad was narrowed in June 2012.  He trained with the team from 18 January to mid-March in Perth, Western Australia. In February during the training camp, he played in a four nations test series with the teams being the Kookaburras, Australia A Squad, the Netherlands and Argentina. He played for the Kookoaburras against Argentina in the second game of the series where his team won 3–1.  He scored a goal for his team. In another game against Argentina at the same competition, his team won 4-0 and he scored a goal. He was selected to play for Australia in the 2012 Summer Olympics, scoring two goals, including one in the bronze medal match where Australia beat Great Britain 3–1.

Recognition
In 2010, Orchard earned the Kookaburra's 2010 Player of the Year award, an award he shared with Eddie Ockenden.

References

External links
 
 
 
 

Australian male field hockey players
Living people
1986 births
Field hockey players at the 2012 Summer Olympics
Olympic field hockey players of Australia
Olympic bronze medalists for Australia
Olympic medalists in field hockey
Medalists at the 2012 Summer Olympics
Field hockey players at the 2014 Commonwealth Games
Commonwealth Games gold medallists for Australia
Field hockey players at the 2010 Commonwealth Games
Field hockey players at the 2016 Summer Olympics
Commonwealth Games medallists in field hockey
Hockey India League players
2010 Men's Hockey World Cup players
2014 Men's Hockey World Cup players
Medallists at the 2010 Commonwealth Games
Medallists at the 2014 Commonwealth Games